The 1994 Australian Touring Car season was the 35th year of touring car racing in Australia since the first runnings of the Australian Touring Car Championship and the fore-runner of the present day Bathurst 1000, the Armstrong 500.

Two major touring car categories raced in Australia during 1994, 5.0 Litre Touring Cars and 2.0 Litre Touring Cars. Between them there were 21 touring car race meetings held during 1994; a ten-round series for 5.0 Litre and 2.0 Litre Touring Cars - the 1994 Australian Touring Car Championship (ATCC); a six-round series for 2.0 Litre Touring Cars - the 1994 Australian Manufacturers' Championship (AMC); support programme events at the 1994 Australian Grand Prix and 1994 Australian FAI Indycar Grand Prix, two stand alone long-distance races, nicknamed 'enduros'; the Winfield Triple Challenge at Eastern Creek Raceway.

Results and standings

Race calendar
The 1994 Australian touring car season consisted of 21 events.

Winfield Triple Challenge
Held at Eastern Creek Raceway , this meeting featured 5.0 Litre Touring Cars, Superbikes and Drag Racing.

Australian Touring Car Championship

Courier Mail Gold Coast 100
This meeting was a support event of the 1994 Australian FAI Indycar Grand Prix. Unusually the main event was held on the Saturday with the shorter sprint event held the next day.

Australian Manufacturers' Championship

Sandown 500

Tooheys 1000

Sensational Adelaide Touring Cars
This meeting was a support event of the 1994 Australian Grand Prix.

References

Linked articles contain additional references.

Australian Touring Car Championship
Supercar seasons
Touring Cars
1994 in V8 Supercars